The 1956 French Championships men's doubles was one of the competitions of the 1956 French Championships, a tennis tournament held at the Stade Roland-Garros in Paris, France  from 15 May until 26 May 1956. The matches were played in a best-of-five sets format. Don Candy and  Bob Perry defeated Ashley Cooper and  Lew Hoad 7–5, 6–3, 6–3 in the final to win the title. The winning teams received 25,000 French franc per player with the runner-up players earning 12,000 Fr and the four losing semifinalists receiving 6,000 Fr each.

Draw

Finals

References

External links
 Roland-Garros winners list
 Association of Tennis Professionals (ATP) – main draw

French Championships - Men's Doubles
French Open by year – Men's doubles
1956 in French tennis